National Democratic Party may refer to:

A–L
 National Democratic Party (Argentina), 1931–1955
 National Democratic Party (Austria, 1967–88)
National Democratic Party (Bangladesh)
 National Democratic Party (Barbados)
 National Democratic Party (Bosnia and Herzegovina)
 National Democratic Party (British Guiana), led by Rudy Kendall
 National Democratic Party (British Virgin Islands)
 National Democratic Party (Bulgaria)
 National Democratic Party (Cayman Islands)
 National Democratic Party (Chile)
 National Democratic Party (Czechoslovakia)
 National Democratic Party (Djibouti)
 National Democratic Party (Egypt), founded by President Anwar El Sadat in 1978 - dissolved in 2011
 National Democratic Party (Fiji, 1960s)
 National Democratic Party (Fiji, 2006)
 National Democratic Party (Georgia)
 National Democratic Party of Germany (East Germany)
 National Democratic Party of Germany
 National Democratic Party (Ghana)
 National Democratic Party (Gold Coast), active from 1950 to 1952
 National Democratic Party (Greece), in the 1920s led by Georgios Kondylis
 National Democratic Party (Hungary)
 National Democratic Party (India)
 National Democratic Party (Indonesia)
 National Democratic Party (Kerala), in Kerala, India from 1974 to 1996
 National Democratic Party (Iraq, 1946)
 National Democratic Party (Iraq)
 National Democratic Party (Ireland)
 National Democratic Party (Japan, 1929), led by Miyazaki Ryusuke
 National Democratic Party (Japan), from 1950 until 1952
 National Democratic Party of Liberia
 National Democratic Party of Lithuania

M–Z
 National Democratic Party (Morocco)
 National Democratic Party (Namibia)
 National Democratic Party (Nepal)
 National Democratic Party (Nigeria)
 National Democratic Party (North Macedonia)
 National Democratic Party (Northern Ireland)
 National Democratic Party (Pakistan)
 National-Democratic Party (Poland)
 National Democratic Party (Rhodesia), predecessor of the Zimbabwe African People's Union
 National Democratic Party (Romania)
 National Democratic Party (Sint Maarten)
 National-Democratic Party (Slovakia), predecessor of the Democratic Union
 National Democratic Party (Slovenia)
 National Democratic Party of Spain
 National Democratic Party (Suriname)
 National Democratic Party of Tibet, the primary political party of the Tibetan government in exile
 National Democratic and Labour Party, a British party often known as the National Democratic Party
 National Democratic Party (UK, 1966)
 National Democratic Party (United States), historic political party, not to be confused with the modern United States Democratic Party
 National Democratic Party of Alabama, in U.S., opposed George Wallace
 National Democratic Party (Venezuela)

See also
 Democratic National Party (disambiguation)
 National Democrats (disambiguation)
 National Party (disambiguation)
 NDP (disambiguation)
 National Democracy (disambiguation)
 National Democratic Movement (disambiguation)
 Nationalist Democracy Party, a former political party in Turkey